Holocraspedon mediopuncta is a moth of the family Erebidae. It was described by Walter Rothschild in 1913. It is found on the Solomon Islands.

References

Moths described in 1913
Lithosiini